Thousand Island dressing is an American salad dressing and condiment based on mayonnaise that can include olive oil, lemon juice, orange juice, paprika, Worcestershire sauce, mustard, vinegar, cream, chili sauce, tomato purée, and ketchup or Tabasco sauce.

It also typically contains finely chopped ingredients, which can include pickles, onions, bell peppers, green olives, hard-boiled egg, parsley, pimento, chives, garlic, or chopped nuts (such as walnuts or chestnuts).

History
According to The Oxford Companion to American Food and Drink, the dressing's name comes from the Thousand Islands region, located along the upper St. Lawrence River between the United States and Canada. Within that region, one common version of the dressing's origins says that a fishing guide's wife, Sophia LaLonde, made the condiment as part of her husband George's shore dinner. Often in this version, actress May Irwin requested the recipe after enjoying it. Irwin, in turn, gave it to another. In another, second version of the story, Thousand Islands summer resident, George Boldt, who built Boldt Castle between 1900 and 1904 and who was proprietor of the Waldorf-Astoria Hotel, instructed the hotel's maître d'hôtel, Oscar Tschirky, to put the dressing on the menu in 1894 after he forgot dressing on salads and improvised with what ingredients were on hand at the time. A 1959 National Geographic article states, "Thousand Island Dressing was reportedly developed by Boldt's chef." Despite claims that he was involved in the introduction of the salad dressing at the Waldorf, chef Tschirky did not mention the salad dressing in his cookbook that was published during that time period.

When University of Wisconsin sociologist Michael Bell and his graduate students attempted to determine the origin of Thousand Island dressing in 2010, they found that the story differed among villages and islands in the Thousand Islands region. They discovered the existence of a third origin story in which the original recipe was based upon French dressing, which is supported by a recipe published in the 11th edition of The Fannie Farmer Cookbook (1965). All the claims appeared to be based upon oral traditions without supporting written records.

According to Food & Wine magazine, the dressing was a traditional sauce from the late 19th century in the Thousand Islands region. The wealthy who visited the region carried bottles of the local sauce back to New York City, such as one variant found in Clayton, New York, called Sophia's Sauce found at a local hotel, Herald Hotel run by innkeeper Sophia Lelonde.

Some food writers advance the claim that the dressing was invented by chef Theo Rooms of the Blackstone Hotel in Chicago during the same time period.  The food historians at The Food Timeline point out that the earliest print reference to Thousand Island dressing appeared in 1912, and that recipes for different versions of the dressing begin to appear afterwards throughout the U.S.

Uses

It is widely used in fast-food restaurants and diners in the United States, where it is often referred to as "special sauce" or "secret sauce". An example of this is In-N-Out Burger's "spread", served on burgers and several "secret menu" items; despite its name, it is a variation of Thousand Island dressing. Thousand Island dressing is often used in a Reuben sandwich in lieu of Russian dressing. McDonald's Big Mac sauce is a variation on Thousand Island dressing.

Similar preparations
Rhode Island dressing (Rhode islandsås), introduced by the Swedish restaurateur Tore Wretman, is similar to Thousand Island and very popular in Sweden. Its name is confusing, especially for foreigners, and its origin unclear, since the dressing has no relationship to Rhode Island and the name is not used for preparations outside Sweden.

In Germany, a similar salad dressing is called "American dressing".

See also

 Fry sauce
 Marie Rose sauce
 Russian dressing
 French dressing
 Salsa golf
 Sauce

References

External links

 Thousand Islands: Thousand Islands Dressing early printed citations collected by Barry Popik

Canadian cuisine
Salad dressings
Food and drink introduced in the 19th century
Mayonnaise
American condiments